The Nahuel DL-43 tank was a medium tank developed in Argentina during World War II. It was the Argentine equivalent of the M4 Sherman and the M3 Grant American medium tanks.

Design 
The designer was Lt. Colonel Alfredo Baisi. The word Nahuel means "jaguar" in the aboriginal language Mapudungun. It was armed with a 75 mm gun (taken from the Krupp Model 1909 Field Gun used by the Argentine Army) in a rotating armored turret.

Its design is similar to that of the United States Army M4 Medium and the early versions of the M3 Grant but with sloped armor. Contrary to popular belief it was not a copy of the M4 Sherman, but the design of the M4 influenced it.

Production 
Only 12 tanks and one wooden mock-up were produced by the Arsenal Esteban de Luca in Buenos Aires and supplied to the Argentine Army, because of the availability of cheap surplus Sherman tanks, several of which were provided by Belgium and the United Kingdom in the late 1940s.

Operators 
 Argentine Army

See also 

 Argentina during World War II
 Ñandú (vehicle)
 TAM (tank)
 Patagón

Comparable tanks

 British Cromwell
 Canadian Grizzly I
German Panzer III
 German Panzer IV
 Hungarian Turán III
 Italian Carro Armato P 40
 Italian P43 (proposal)
 Japanese Type 3 Chi-Nu
 Romanian 1942 medium tank (proposal)
 Swedish Stridsvagn m/42
 American M4 Sherman

References 
Notes

Bibliography
 Sigal Fogliani, Ricardo Jorge, Nahuel DL 43 - Tanques Argentinos (desde sus orígenes hasta 1950), Editorial Dunken, Buenos Aires, 2004, .
 Sigal Fogliani, Ricardo Jorge, Blindados Argentinos, de Uruguay y Paraguay, Ayer y Hoy Ediciones, Buenos Aires, 1997.  .
Ness, Leland Jane's World War II Tanks and Fighting Vehicles - The complete guide, HarperCollins Publishers, London 2002,

Further reading

External links

 Photo gallery TANKS! Armoured warfare prior to 1946
 Photo gallery Mimerswell
 1909 Krupp 75mm L/30 gun (field Version) 
  Siguiendo las huellas del Nahuel Para reconstruirlo en 1:35, by Juan Carlos Heredia (2012) - Fundacion Soldados website (accessed 2016-10-16)

Tanks of Argentina
World War II medium tanks
World War II military equipment of Argentina
Military vehicles introduced from 1940 to 1944